Unión Deportiva Llanera is a Spanish football club based in Posada de Llanera, in the autonomous community of Asturias. Founded in 1981, it plays in Segunda División RFEF – Group 1, holding home matches at Estadio Pepe Quimarán.

History
The first team called UD Llanera was founded in 1961. This team played in Segunda Regional until the 1969–70, before being disbanded.

In 1981, two former players of the old club convinced Pepe Quimarán, whose name was given to the new stadium of the club, to create a new UD Llanera. In 1987 the club achieved its first promotion ever to Primera Regional.

From 1994 to 1997, the senior team of UD Llanera was disbanded, but the youth teams continued their activity.

In May 2016, after 35 years of playing in regional divisions, the club was promoted for the first time in its history to the Tercera División.

Season to season

1 season in Segunda División RFEF
5 seasons in Tercera División

Stadium

Estadio Las Huelgas was the first home stadium of UD Llanera. It was used until the construction of the new Estadio Pepe Quimarán. The pitch measures 94x48 m and has a capacity for 1,000 people.

Women's team
UD Llanera created a women's football team in 2007. It competed always in the Regional league except in the 2011–12, after an agreement with Oviedo Moderno CF to be its reserve team in Segunda División. In the next season, after its relegation, the agreement was terminated.

Llanera came back to Segunda División in 2017, after finishing as runner-up of the regional league and the ineligibility of Oviedo Moderno B to promote.

Season by season

References

External links
Official website 

Football clubs in Asturias
Association football clubs established in 1981
1981 establishments in Spain